MBC News at 5 is an early morning newscast broadcast of weekdays at 5:00 KST. Its anchored by Park Chang-Heon.

References

South Korean television news shows
MBC TV original programming
2012 South Korean television series debuts